U.S. Highways in Texas are owned and maintained by the state. These U.S. Highways are the second-highest category of road classifications in the Texas road system, just below the Interstate Highways. U.S. Highways are marked with a number contained inside a white shield in a black box. The number is generally even if the highway runs east-west, and generally odd if it runs north–south, though there are many substantial deviations from this plan.

Mainline highways

Special routes

See also

References

Notes

External links
Texas Department of Transportation
Texas Highway Man

U.S.